Hjalmar Stefanus Mellander (14 December 1880 – 3 October 1919) was a Swedish track and field athlete. He competed in the 800 m, long jump, javelin throw and ancient pentathlon at the 1906 Intercalated Games and finished fourth in the long jump and javelin throw. He won the pentathlon event, which consisted of standing long jump, Greek-style discus throw, javelin throw, 192 m sprint and Greco-Roman wrestling.

Mellander was a physiotherapist who practiced in Liverpool since 1902. In 1919 he died while trying to rescue a drowning man on the Isle of Man.

References

1880 births
1919 deaths

Athletes (track and field) at the 1906 Intercalated Games
Swedish pentathletes
Swedish decathletes
Medalists at the 1906 Intercalated Games